Sugarpine Drive-In is a restaurant along the Historic Columbia River Highway in Troutdale, Oregon.

See also
 List of drive-in restaurants

References

External links
 
 

Drive-in restaurants
Restaurants in Oregon
Troutdale, Oregon